Club Deportivo Humanes is a Spanish football club based in Humanes de Madrid, in the Community of Madrid. Founded in 1951, it plays in Primera Regional de Aficionados.

History 
The Club was founded in Humanes in 1951 as the town's main football club.

In 2007, the club achieved direct promotion to Tercera División for the first time in its history after finishing second in their group of Preferente. The team, therefore, debuted in Tercera División in the 2007-08 campaign, struggling to stay in the category and failing to avoid relegation. The following year the club returned to Preferente.

Season to season

1 season in Tercera División

Uniform  

Home Kit: Blue shirt, blue shorts and blue socks.
Away Kit: Red shirt, white trousers and red socks.

Stadium 
CD Humanes plays its home matches in the town's municipal stadium, Emilio Zazo, with capacity for 2,000 spectators and artificial turf.

External links
ffmadrid.es profile
futmadrid.com profile

Football clubs in the Community of Madrid
Divisiones Regionales de Fútbol clubs
Association football clubs established in 1951
1951 establishments in Spain